Sursum corda, Op. 11 is a musical work by the English composer Edward Elgar for strings, brass, timpani and organ, composed in 1894.  The composer dedicated it to his friend Henry Dyke Acland (1850-1936), an amateur cellist who was his golfing companion, manager of the Worcester Old Bank in Malvern, and son of Henry Acland.

It was first performed at Worcester Cathedral on 9 April 1894, under the baton of Hugh Blair, organist of the cathedral. The composer was absent from this performance due to the ill health. Its first London performance took place at a Queen's Hall Promenade Concert on 21 September 1901.

The title translates from the Latin to read, "Lift up your hearts".

Instrumentation
The work is scored for strings, 2 trumpets in B, 4 horns in F, 3 trombones, tuba, timpani and organ.

Structure
Adagio solenne b flat major 2/4

The work begins with b flat call of brass. Strings expose main subject shown in excerpt 1.

Excerpt 1

After the climax, the music calms down. A new material is provided in the dialogue between organ and strings following the b flat call (Excerpt 2).

Excerpt 2

Second climax, developed from excerpt 2, is followed by reappearance of excerpt 1. Brass call indicates the end of the final climax, and coda, using excerpt 1 and other materials, concludes the work with satisfying sound of tutti.

Average performance of this work needs approximately 10 minutes.

Transcriptions
The work is transcribed for concert band by Bruce Houseknecht. This band version was published in 1967 by Carl Fischer, Inc.

Notes

References
 
 
 
 Score, Elgar: Sursum Corda, B. Schott's Söhne, 1901

External links
 
 Sursum corda on website from Elgar Society
 

Compositions by Edward Elgar
Music for orchestra and organ
1894 compositions
Compositions in B-flat major